The Ready-Cates Farm is a historic farmhouse in Milton, Tennessee, U.S.. It was built circa 1870 for Christopher Columbus Ready and his wife, Mary Annis. Ready used the farm to grow wheat and corn, and raise hogs, horses and
cattle. It was inherited by their son, Irvin Ernest Ready, in 1898. It has been listed on the National Register of Historic Places since July 27, 2005.

References

Farms on the National Register of Historic Places in Tennessee
Houses on the National Register of Historic Places in Tennessee
Houses completed in 1870
National Register of Historic Places in Cannon County, Tennessee